George Bowyer may refer to:

Sir George Bowyer, 5th Baronet (1740–1800), British naval officer and MP for Queenborough
Sir George Bowyer, 6th Baronet (1783–1860), British Whig MP for Malmesbury and Abingdon
Sir George Bowyer, 7th Baronet (1811–1883), British barrister and Liberal MP for Dundalk and Wexford County
George Bowyer, 1st Baron Denham (1886–1948), British Conservative MP for Buckingham and Comptroller of the Household
George Bowyer (singer), British singer